Ferdinand Minnaert (27 November 1887 – 26 August 1975) was a Belgian gymnast. He competed in the men's team all-around event at the 1920 Summer Olympics, winning the silver medal.

References

1887 births
1975 deaths
Belgian male artistic gymnasts
Olympic gymnasts of Belgium
Gymnasts at the 1920 Summer Olympics
Olympic silver medalists for Belgium
Medalists at the 1920 Summer Olympics
Olympic medalists in gymnastics
Sportspeople from Ghent
20th-century Belgian people